The 1997 Canoe Sprint European Championships were held in Plovdiv, Bulgaria.

Medal overview

Men

Women

Medal table

References

External links
 European Canoe Association

Canoe Sprint European Championships
1997 in Bulgarian sport
1997 in canoeing
Canoeing in Bulgaria